Swaffer is a surname. Notable people with the surname include:

Hannen Swaffer (1879–1962), English journalist and drama critic
John Swaffer (1851—1936), English cricketer
Kate Swaffer (born 1958), Australian advocate for dementia patients
Kristyn Swaffer (born 1975), Australian football player
Patrick Swaffer (born 1951), British film industry executive